Qantas Flight 1 (QF1, QFA1) was a Qantas passenger flight between Sydney and London that was involved in a runway overrun accident at Don Mueang International Airport in Bangkok on 23 September 1999 as it was landing for a stopover.

Flight 

Qantas flights travel between London and Australia on a route known as the "Kangaroo Route". The Kangaroo Route traditionally refers to air routes flown between Australia and the United Kingdom, via the Eastern Hemisphere.

This flight was operated by Senior Check Captain Jack Fried in a Boeing 747-438 S/N 24806, delivered new to Qantas in August 1990 and registered VH-OJH. It departed Sydney earlier that day at 16:45 local time, and after more than eight hours of flight time, was approaching Don Mueang International Airport at 22:45 local time.

Accident 

During the approach to Bangkok, the weather conditions deteriorated significantly, from 5 statute mile visibility half an hour before landing to nearly one half statute mile visibility at the time of landing. The flight crew observed a storm cloud over the airport and ground reports were that it was raining heavily. However, these conditions are common at Bangkok. Seven minutes prior to Flight 1's landing, a Thai Airways Airbus A330 landed normally, but three minutes before Flight 1's landing another Qantas Boeing 747 (QF15, a Sydney-Rome via Bangkok service), conducted a go-around due to poor visibility during final approach. The crew of Qantas Flight 1, however, were unaware of this.

The first officer was flying the aircraft during the final approach. The aircraft's altitude and airspeed were high, but were within company limits. The rain was now heavy enough that the runway lights were visible only intermittently after each windscreen wiper stroke. Just before touchdown the captain, concerned about the long touchdown point (over 3000 feet past the runway threshold) and unable to see the end of the runway, ordered the first officer to perform a "go-around" and the first officer advanced the throttles but did not engage the takeoff/go-around switch (TO/GA). At this point, visibility improved markedly and the landing gear contacted the runway, although the aircraft continued to accelerate. The captain then decided to cancel the go-around by retarding the thrust levers, even though he was not flying the aircraft. This caused confusion as he did not announce his actions to the first officer who still had formal control. When over-riding the first officer's actions, the captain inadvertently left one engine at TO/GA power and as a result cancelled the preselected auto-brake settings.

The landing continued, but manual braking did not commence until the aircraft was over 5,200 feet down the runway. The aircraft then began to aquaplane and skid its way down the runway, departing substantially from the runway centreline. Company standard operating procedures mandated that idle reverse thrust should be used for landings and that flaps should be set at 25 degrees, not the maximum of 30 degrees. The combination of flaps 25, no auto-braking, no reverse thrust, a high and fast approach, a late touchdown, poor cockpit resource management, and the standing water on the runway led to a runway overshoot.

The aircraft gradually decelerated, ran off the end of the runway over a stretch of boggy grassland, colliding with a ground radio antenna as it did so, and came to rest with its nose resting on the perimeter road. The ground on the other side of the road forms part of a golf course.

There were no significant passenger injuries during an orderly evacuation of the aircraft carried out some 20 minutes after the rough landing. Thirty-eight passengers reported minor injuries.

Damage
The collision with the antenna caused the nose and right wing landing gear to collapse, the nose landing gear being forced back into the fuselage. The aircraft slid along in a nose-down, right wing low attitude, causing some further damage to the nose and damage to the two right engines and their mountings. The intrusion of the nose landing gear also caused the failure of the cabin intercom and public address system.

The damage was such that the aircraft was initially a write-off, but to preserve its reputation Qantas had it repaired at a cost of less than AU$100 million (the exact figure was never disclosed by Qantas). Returning the aircraft to service enabled Qantas to retain its record of having no hull-loss accidents since the advent of the Jet Age, and also proved to be the more economical option for the time, as a new 747-400 was listed close to $200 million.

See also 

 Runway safety area
 Engineered materials arrestor system
 Scandinavian Airlines System Flight 901
 China Eastern Airlines Flight 5398
 Sky Lease Cargo Flight 4854
 Air France Flight 358

Notes

References

Bibliography 
 Australian Transport Safety Bureau report on the accident

External links 
 

001
Aviation accidents and incidents in Thailand
Airliner accidents and incidents caused by weather
Aviation accidents and incidents in 1999
Accidents and incidents involving the Boeing 747
Airliner accidents and incidents involving runway overruns
1999 in Thailand
September 1999 events in Asia